Heister House is a Moderne (Art Deco) house built in 1943 in Salida, Colorado.  The building  was listed on the National Register of Historic Places on October 8, 2008.

It is the 15th property listed as a featured property of the week in a program of the National Park Service that began in July, 2008.

See also
National Register of Historic Places listings in Chaffee County, Colorado

References

Houses on the National Register of Historic Places in Colorado
Houses in Chaffee County, Colorado
Houses completed in 1943
Moderne architecture in Colorado
National Register of Historic Places in Chaffee County, Colorado
1943 establishments in Colorado